Otaņķi Parish is an administrative unit of South Kurzeme Municipality in the Courland region of Latvia. The parish has a population of 962 (as of 1/07/2010) and covers an area of 120.5 km2.

Villages of Otaņķi Parish

 Baidzele
 Banažgals
 Dorupe
 Laukgals
 Laurciems
 Mežgals
 Otaņķi
 Rude
 Rumbasgals
 Šķuburi
 Upmaļciems

Parishes of Latvia
South Kurzeme Municipality
Courland